Pierre Gossez (born August 6, 1928, Valenciennes) is a French jazz reedist.

Gossez was active as a sideman in many contexts in the 1950s, working with Noël Chiboust, Tony Murena, Jacques Hélian, Michel Legrand, and Martial Solal. He also began playing with Claude Bolling in 1956, and would work with him into the 1970s. In the 1960s he played with Sonny Grey, Michel Hausser, André Hodeir, Ivan Jullien, Guy Lafitte, and the Paris Jazz All Stars. Associations in the 1970s included Jullien again, Maxim Saury, Dany Doriz, and Gunther Schuller. He worked with Bob Quibel and with Solal for most of the 1980s. In 1986 played saxophone on  Rendez-Vous (Jean-Michel Jarre album) album. The track is called Ron's Piece, in honor of Ronald "Ron" McNair, was one of the astronauts perished in the Space Shuttle Challenger disaster.

Gossez also recorded under the name Alan Gate for sessions under his own name in the 1960s.

References
Michel Laplace, "Pierre Gossez". The New Grove Dictionary of Jazz.  2nd edition, ed. Barry Kernfeld.

French jazz saxophonists
Male saxophonists
French jazz clarinetists
French male jazz musicians
1928 births
Living people